Tellurite methyltransferase (TehB) is an enzyme with systematic name S-adenosyl-L-methionine:tellurite methyltransferase. This enzyme catalyses the following chemical reaction

 S-adenosyl-L-methionine + tellurite  S-adenosyl-L-homocysteine + methanetelluronate

The enzyme is involved in the detoxification of tellurite.

References

External links 
 

EC 2.1.1